Le sette folgori di Assur (English title: War Gods of Babylon) is a 1962 Italian film set in ancient Mesopotamia, which anachronistically portrays several figures as contemporaries who historically lived hundreds of years apart.

Plot
Mirra, a young girl whose parents were killed by the Assyrians, was found by Zoroaster, messenger of the gods, near her slaughtered people. He leads her to Nineveh ruled by King Sardanapalus. A love is born between her and Shammash, brother of the king. Sardanapalus loves her too and realizing that this passion could create discord with his brother appoints Shammach king of Babylon and sends him there with Mirra.

Cast
Howard Duff as Sardanapalus
Jocelyn Lane as Mirra
Luciano Marin as Sammash
Giancarlo Sbragia as Arbace
Arnoldo Foà as Zoroaster
Stelio Candelli as Hammurabi
José Greci as Crisia

See also
 List of historical drama films and series set in Near Eastern and Western civilization
 I Am Semiramis (1963)

External links
 

1960s adventure drama films
1960s action adventure films
1962 films
1962 drama films
Italian historical adventure films
Italian action adventure films
1960s Italian-language films
English-language Italian films
1960s English-language films
Films about royalty
Films set in the Middle East
Films set in the 7th century BC
Films set in Iraq
Italian romantic drama films
Peplum films
Films directed by Silvio Amadio
Films scored by Carlo Savina
Cultural depictions of Zoroaster
Sword and sandal films
Historical epic films
Assyrian culture
1960s multilingual films
Italian multilingual films
1960s Italian films